Karen Brown  (born 9 January 1963) is a former field hockey defender, who was a member of the British squad that won the bronze medal at the 1992 Summer Olympics in Barcelona, Commonwealth Silver medal and European Gold 

Brown is England and Great Britain's second-highest capped player of all time, with 355 caps to her name. Her record was broken by Kate Richardson-Walsh in February 2016 during a test series with Australia, where Brown was working as Assistant Coach in the GB Team.

She competed in three consecutive Summer Olympics, starting in 1988. Brown retired in 1999, having played for England on 179 occasions & Great Britain 176. Brown (England, March 1984 – August 1999) played a total of 355 international matches and has the most (5) appearances in the European Championship.

Coaching career 
She was Assistant Coach for both the Great Britain and England hockey teams and part of the management teams that secured a World Cup bronze with England in 2010, Olympic bronze with Great Britain at the London Olympics, European Gold in 2015 and Olympic Gold at the Rio Olympics.

She stepped down from her role as Assistant Coach in January 2017, with the intention of working for England and GB Hockey in a coach development capacity.

References

External links
 
 
 
 
 

English female field hockey players
English field hockey coaches
Field hockey players at the 1988 Summer Olympics
Field hockey players at the 1992 Summer Olympics
Field hockey players at the 1996 Summer Olympics
Olympic field hockey players of Great Britain
British female field hockey players
Olympic bronze medallists for Great Britain
1963 births
Living people
Commonwealth Games silver medallists for England
People from Redhill, Surrey
Sportspeople from Surrey
Olympic medalists in field hockey
Medalists at the 1992 Summer Olympics
Commonwealth Games medallists in field hockey
Members of the Order of the British Empire
Field hockey players at the 1998 Commonwealth Games
Medallists at the 1998 Commonwealth Games